The 68HC11 (6811 or HC11 for short) is an 8-bit microcontroller (µC) family introduced by Motorola in 1984.  Now produced by NXP Semiconductors, it descended from the Motorola 6800 microprocessor by way of the 6801. The 68HC11 devices are more powerful and more expensive than the 68HC08 microcontrollers, and are used in automotive applications, barcode readers, hotel card key writers, amateur robotics, and various other embedded systems. The MC68HC11A8 was the first microcontroller to include CMOS EEPROM.

Architecture

Internally, the HC11 instruction set is backward compatible with the 6800 and features the addition of a Y index register.  It has two eight-bit accumulators, A and B, two sixteen-bit index registers, X and Y, a condition code register, a 16-bit stack pointer, and a program counter.  In addition, there is an 8 x 8-bit multiply (A x B), with full 16-bit result, and fractional/integer 16-bit by 16-bit divide instructions. A range of 16-bit instructions treat the A and B registers as a combined 16-bit D register for comparison (X and Y registers may also be compared to 16-bit memory operands), addition, subtraction and shift operations, or can add the B accumulator to the X or Y index registers. Bit test operations have also been added, performing a logical and function between operands, setting the correct conditions codes, but not modifying the operands.

Different versions of the HC11 have different numbers of external ports, labeled alphabetically.  The most common version has five ports, A, B, C, D, and E, but some have as few as 3 ports (version D3). Each port is eight bits wide except for D, which is six bits (in some variations of the chip, D also has eight bits). It can be operated with an internal program and RAM (1 to 768 bytes) or an external memory of up to 64 kilobytes. With external memory, B and C are used as address and data bus.  In this mode, port C is multiplexed to carry both the lower byte of the address and data.

Implementations

In the early 1990s Motorola produced an evaluation board kit for the 68HC11 with several UARTs, RAM, and an EPROM. The cost of the evaluation kit was $68.11.

The standard monitor for the HC11 family is called BUFFALO, "Bit User Fast Friendly Aid to Logical Operation". It can be stored in on-chip ROM, EPROM, or external memory (also typically EPROM). BUFFALO is available for most 68HC11 family derivatives as it generally only depends upon having access to a single UART (SCI, or Serial Communications Interface, in Motorola parlance). BUFFALO can also run on devices that do not have internal non-volatile memory, such as the 68HC11A0, A1, E0, E1, and F1 derivatives.

Other versions
The Freescale 68HC16 microcontroller family is intended as a 16-bit mostly software compatible upgrade of the 68HC11.

The Freescale 68HC12 microcontroller family is an enhanced 16-bit version of the 68HC11.

The Handy Board robotics controller by Fred Martin is based on the 68HC11.

A MC68HC24 port replacement unit is available for the HC11.  When placed on the external address bus, it replicates the original functions of B and C.  Port A has input capture, output compare, pulse accumulator, and other timer functions; port D has serial I/O, and port E has an analog-to-digital converter (ADC).

Notes

References

Further reading
Datasheets and manuals
 M68HC11 Reference Manual; Motorola; 498 pages; 1991.
 MC68HC11A8 Technical Manual; Motorola; 154 pages; 1991.
 MC68HC11E9 Technical Manual; Motorola; 170 pages; 1991.
Books
 Microcontroller Technology – 68HC11; 1st Ed; Peter Spasov; Regents/Prentice Hall; 622 pages; 1993; . (archive)
 Build Your Own Robot – 68HC11; 1st Ed; Karl Lunt; A.K. Peters Publishing; 574 pages; 2000; . (archive)

External links
 Freescale 68HC11 (Legacy) Part Info
 ASM11 macro cross-assembler for Windows and Linux
Simulators / Emulators
 THRSim11 68HC11 simulator and debugger – Windows
Boards
 4MHz-bus 68HC11F1-based board
 Wytec 68HC11 Development Board
FPGA
 System11 68HC11 CPU core – VHDL source code – OpenCores – project website
 Green Mountain Synthesizable 68HC11 CPU core – VHDL source code

NXP Semiconductors microcontrollers
Freescale Semiconductor microcontrollers
Motorola microcontrollers